İncesu, formerly Sadogara, is a town and district of Kayseri Province in the Central Anatolia region of Turkey. 
The mayor is Zekeriya Karayol (AKP).

History
At the beginning of the 20th century, Greeks still lived partly in Incesu. Most of them went with the Turkish-Greek Population Exchange. There is the Kara Mustafa Pasha Caravanserai built by Kara Mustafa Pasha in 1660 in Incesu.

In 2021, archaeologists discovered late Roman and early Byzantine houses, with inscriptions and mosaics.

References

Populated places in Kayseri Province
Districts of Kayseri Province
Towns in Turkey
Ancient Greek archaeological sites in Turkey